This is a list of Portuguese winter football transfers for the 2014–15 season. The winter transfer window opened on 1 January 2015 and closed on 31 January 2015. Players could be bought before the transfer window opened, but were not permitted to join their new clubs until 1 January. Additionally, players without a club could join at any time and clubs were able to sign a goalkeeper on an emergency loan if they had no registered goalkeeper available. Only moves involving Primeira Liga clubs are listed; included are clubs that completed transfers after the closing of the summer 2014 transfer window due to other domestic leagues having a later closure date to their transfer window.

Transfers

 Some players may have been bought after the end of the 2014 summer transfer window in Portugal but before the end of that country's transfer window closed.

References

2014–15 in Portuguese football
Football transfers winter 2014–15
Lists of Portuguese football transfers